John Cornelius "Jack" Rafter (February 20, 1875 – January 5, 1943) was a Major League Baseball catcher who played in  with the Pittsburgh Pirates. In one game, he went hitless in three at-bats. He attended Fordham University.

He was born in and died in Troy, New York.

External links

1875 births
1943 deaths
Baseball players from New York (state)
Pittsburgh Pirates players
Major League Baseball catchers
Fordham Rams baseball players
Minor league baseball managers
Binghamton Bingoes players
Allentown Buffaloes players
Syracuse Stars (minor league baseball) players
Albany Senators players
Lancaster Maroons players
Torrington Tornadoes players
Pottsville (minor league baseball) players
Carbondale Anthracites players
Philadelphia Athletics (minor league) players
Troy Washerwomen players
Troy Trojans (minor league) players
Memphis Egyptians players
Lowell Tigers players
Amsterdam-Gloversville-Johnstown Jags players